Carole Bayer Sager is the debut studio album by American songwriter Carole Bayer Sager, released in 1977 by Elektra Records. It included the song "You're Moving Out Today", which became a 1977 Australian number one single and also reached number 6 in the UK Singles Chart. The album itself was also a success in Australia, reaching the top 10, as well as receiving a gold certification there. It was produced by Brooks Arthur.

Track listing

Personnel

Musicians

 Carole Bayer Sager – lead vocals, background vocals (5, 9)
 Lee Ritenour – acoustic guitar (1, 5, 6, 10), electric guitar (6, 10), guitar (4), mandolin (4)
 Johnny Vastano – acoustic guitar (2), background vocals (2)
 Al Gorgoni – acoustic guitar (7)
 Thom Rotella – acoustic guitar (8, 9), electric guitar (8)
 Jerry Friedman – acoustic guitar (9)
 Bruce Roberts – background vocals (5-8), piano (5–8)
 Madeline Kahn – background vocals (7)
 Abigail Haness – background vocals (3)
 Brenda Russell – background vocals (2, 3)
 Melissa Manchester – background vocals (2, 10), harpsichord (10), arrangements (10), piano (1, 10)
 Tony Orlando – background vocals (3)
 Peter Allen – background vocals (9), piano (3, 9)
 Bette Midler – background vocals (9)
 Bob Cranshaw – bass (3, 9)
 Emory Gordy – bass (4)
 Lee Sklar – bass (1, 2, 5, 6, 10)
 Will Lee – bass (7, 8)
 Allan Schwartsberg – cabasa (3), drums (3)
 Marvin Hamlisch – celesta (4), electric piano (4), piano (4)
 Paul Buckmaster – strings and horns arrangements (1, 2, 4–10), synthesizer (4)
 Gene Page – strings and horns arrangements (3)
 Alan Estes – congas (3-7), percussion (3, 9)
 Andy Newmark – drums (9)
 Jim Keltner – drums (4, 5)
 Roy Markowitz – drums (7, 8)
 Russ Kunkel – drums (2, 6, 10)
 Jerry Friedman – electric guitar (7)
 Lance Quinn – electric guitar (3)
 Nicky Hopkins – electric piano (2), piano (2)
 Artie Butler – organ (2)
 Bob Margouleff – programming (4)
 Hugh McCracken – slide guitar (8)
 Garnett Brown – trombone (8)

Production
 Ivy Skoff – production coordination
 Brooks Arthur – sound engineer, producer
 Bob Merritt – sound engineer
 David Thoener – sound engineer
 David Latman – sound engineer
 Connie Pappas – management
 John Reid Ent – management

Design
 Tony Lane – art direction, design
 Anne Garner – design
 Claude Mougin – photography
 David Alexander – photography

Charts

Certifications and sales

References

External links
 

1977 debut albums
Carole Bayer Sager albums
Elektra Records albums